My Weakness is a 1933 American pre-Code musical film directed by David Butler and starring Lilian Harvey, Lew Ayres and Charles Butterworth. It was the second of four films made by the British-German actress Harvey in Hollywood, who had emerged as major star during Weimar Germany.

It both was and wasn't the first mainstream Hollywood film to use the word "gay" as a descriptor of homosexuality.  In one scene, Charles Butterworth and Sid Silvers commiserate over their miserable, hopeless shared love for Lilian Harvey, until Butterworth is struck by a solution: "Let's be gay!"  However, the Studio Relations Committee censors decreed that the line had to be muffled.

Synopsis
A wealthy young man bets that he can turn a cleaning woman into a sophisticated lady and trick three men into wanting to marry her.

Cast
 Lilian Harvey as Looloo Blake  
 Lew Ayres as Ronnie Gregory  
 Charles Butterworth as Gerald Gregory 
 Harry Langdon as Dan Cupid  
 Sid Silvers as Maxie  
 Irene Bentley as Jane Holman  
 Henry Travers as Ellery Gregory  
 Adrian Rosley as Baptiste  
 Mary Howard as Diana Griffith
 Irene Ware as Eve Millstead 
 Barbara Weeks as Lois Crowley  
 Susan Fleming as Jacqueline Wood  
 Marcelle Edwards as Marion  
 Marjorie King as Lillian  
 Jean Allen as Consuello  
 Gladys Blake as Mitzi  
 Dixie Francis as Dixie

References

Bibliography
 Solomon, Aubrey. The Fox Film Corporation, 1915-1935: A History and Filmography. McFarland, 2011.

External links

1933 films
American musical films
1933 musical films
1930s English-language films
Films directed by David Butler
Fox Film films
American black-and-white films
Films scored by Arthur Lange
Films scored by Cyril J. Mockridge
1930s American films